Francis Elliott Kranz (born July 13, 1981) is an American actor and film director. He is known for his portrayal of Topher Brink in the science fiction drama series Dollhouse. He had prominent roles in the films The Cabin in the Woods and Much Ado About Nothing. In 2012, he played Bernard in Death of a Salesman, beginning a career on Broadway that continued with 2014's You Can't Take It with You.

Kranz made his feature directorial debut with Mass (2021), which premiered at Sundance Film Festival to critical acclaim.

Personal life
Kranz was born and raised in Los Angeles, California. He started acting in third and fourth grade, and knew from a very young age that he wanted to become an actor. He graduated from Harvard-Westlake School in 2000 and from Yale University in 2004, where he was a member of the improv comedy group The Ex!t Players.

In 2015, Kranz married actress Spencer Margaret Richmond, daughter of Charlie's Angels actress Jaclyn Smith and filmmaker Tony Richmond. In 2016, their first daughter was born. On July 6, 2020, she filed for divorce.
The divorce was finalized in 2021.

Filmography

Film

Television

Broadway

Web

Music videos

References

External links
 
 Interview with Kranz - "Fran Kranz on theater, film, and his haircut"
 

1981 births
21st-century American male actors
American male comedians
American male film actors
American male television actors
Harvard-Westlake School alumni
Living people
Yale University alumni
Exit Players alumni
Comedians from California
21st-century American comedians